Delting is a civil parish and community council area on Mainland, Shetland, Scotland. It includes the Sullom Voe oil terminal and its main settlements are Brae, Mossbank and Voe.

The parish, as described in 1882–1884, included the islands of Bigga (co-owned with the civil parish of Yell), Fishholm, Brother Isle, Little Roe, and Muckle Roe; of these only Muckle Roe was at that time inhabited. The landward area "varies in breadth from 3 to 6 miles, being much intersected by voes or arms of the sea".

References

External links

Parishes of Shetland
Mainland, Shetland